Model 1875 (M1875) may refer to:

 Remington Model 1875 Single Action Army revolver handgun
 Springfield Model 1875 Officer's Rifle longgun
 M1875 mountain gun, U.S. Army Hotchkiss fieldgun

See also
 1875 (disambiguation)
 M1975 (disambiguation)
 M75 (disambiguation)